Mohamed Alhammadi (born 2 August 1991) is an Olympic athlete from the UAE.

At the Athletics at the 2020 Summer Olympics – Men's 100 metres second preliminary race, Alhammadi ran a personal best time of 10.59 seconds to qualify for the heats.

References

External links
 

1991 births
Living people
Emirati male sprinters
Olympic athletes of the United Arab Emirates
Athletes (track and field) at the 2020 Summer Olympics
Olympic male sprinters